Trường Thủy is a commune in Lệ Thủy District, Quảng Bình Province, Vietnam. The local economy is mainly agricultural, with rice production and cattle breeding.

The mausoleum of Nguyễn Hữu Cảnh and Hoàng Kế Viêm is located here. The Ho Chi Minh Highway crosses this commune.
The commune perches on a hilly and mountainous area where there remain many places with unexploded bombs dropped by the US air forces.

Communes of Quảng Bình province